Hassan Sayed Moawad (died December 2007) was an Egyptian basketball player. He competed in the men's tournament at the 1948 Summer Olympics.

References

Year of birth missing
2007 deaths
Egyptian men's basketball players
Olympic basketball players of Egypt
Basketball players at the 1948 Summer Olympics
Place of birth missing